Pseudophillipsia is a genus of trilobite, notable for it being one of the last members of the group before the extinction at the end of the Permian. It first appeared during the Pennsylvanian or Late Carboniferous. There are several species and this genus has a range spanning Eurasia.

References 

Philipsidae